Ulfa may refer to:

Ulfa (river), of Hesse, Germany
United Liberation Front of Assam
Zakia Ulfa, Indonesian Badminton Player
Ulfa, a district of Nidda, Hesse, Germany
Ulfa (gastropod), a genus in family Pyramidellidae